The National Alliance was a political party in Greece in the 1930s.

History
The party first contested national elections in 1933, winning five seats in the parliamentary elections that year, despite receiving just 1.3% of the vote.

Despite its success, the party did not contest any further elections.

References

Defunct political parties in Greece